Platysaurus attenboroughi (also known as Attenborough's flat lizard) is a species of lizard in the family Cordylidae. It is a small, spiny lizard found in Namibia.

See also
 List of things named after David Attenborough and his works

References

Platysaurus
Reptiles of Namibia
Reptiles described in 2015
Taxa named by William Roy Branch
Taxa named by Mitzy Pepper
Taxa named by J. Scott Keogh